Atlantis 2000 was a short-lived German musical group, set up in Munich in 1990 by producer and singer Alfons Weindorf and composer Helmut Frey, for the purpose of entering the German Eurovision Song Contest selection in 1991.  The group consisted of Weindorf and Frey with Jutta Niedhardt, Eberhard Wilhelm, Klaus Pröpper and Clemens Weindorf (brother of Alfons Weindorf).

On 21 March 1991, Atlantis 2000 took part in the Eurovision selection with the Weindorf and Frey penned "Dieser Traum darf niemals sterben" ("This Dream Must Never Die"), which emerged the winner of the 10 songs. It was not a popular choice with some audience members, who responded with audible signs of disapproval. The song, an anthemic offering typical of most German Eurovision entries of the era, went forward to the 36th Eurovision Song Contest, held on 4 May in Rome, where it could only manage 18th place of 22 entries.

"Dieser Traum darf niemals sterben" was the group's only single release, and following its failure to chart, the group disbanded.

References 

German musical groups
Eurovision Song Contest entrants for Germany
Eurovision Song Contest entrants of 1991